The de Havilland T.K.5 was an unflown 1930s British single-seat canard research aircraft, designed and built by students of the de Havilland Technical School.

Design and development
The T.K.5 was built by students at Stag Lane Aerodrome between 1938 and 1939. It was a low-wing monoplane with a 140 hp (104 kW) de Havilland Gipsy Major IC piston engine driving a pusher propeller.
The only T.K.5, registered G-AFTK, was tested by Geoffrey de Havilland in 1939 but it refused to leave the ground and was scrapped.

Specifications

See also

Notes

References

T.K.5
1930s British experimental aircraft
Canard aircraft
Pusher aircraft